The Diocese of Speyer (lat. Dioecesis Spirensis) is a diocese of the Catholic Church in Germany.  The diocese is located in the South of the Rhineland-Palatinate and comprises also the Saarpfalz district in the east of the Saarland.  The bishop's see is in the Palatinate city of Speyer. 

The current bishop is Karl-Heinz Wiesemann.

As of 31 December 2006, 44.5% of the population of the diocese was Catholic.

History
In a slightly different hierarchic structure it is one of the oldest Dioceses in Germany. A bishop of Speyer was first mentioned in a document in 346. Through grants by the Holy Roman Emperor, the prince-bishops of Speyer established themselves as worldly as well as spiritual rulers. The Diocese of Speyer in its current form was established within the borders of the former Rheinkreis, a district of the Kingdom of Bavaria in 1817 after the secularization and division of the former bishopric in 1803.

For these historical reasons, Speyer belongs to the Province of Bamberg in Bavaria now, even though its territory has no direct border to Bamberg or any other Bamberg suffragan, and is a member of the Episcopal Conference of Bavaria as well as (like all Bavarian bishops) that of Germany.

Bishops

The current bishop is Karl-Heinz Wiesemann. See also Bishop of Speyer for lists of bishops of the diocese and auxiliary bishops.

Administration
The diocese is directed by bishop Karl-Heinz Wiesemann.

The diocese is structured in the following deaneries, with borders that are almost the same as the local county borders:

References

Speyer
Speyer Diocese
Speyer
Speyer
Speyer Diocese
Speyer Diocese